Shimri is the second album by Norwegian jazz bassist and composer Arild Andersen, recorded in 1976 and released on the ECM label.

Reception
The Allmusic review by Jim Todd awarded the album 2½ stars stating: "On Shimri, musical release floats in suspension, grooves are coyly offered then withdrawn, swing is used sparingly, subtly, making only an occasional splash in the ripples of intimate conversation among the members of Arlid Andersen's outstanding quartet".

Track listing
All compositions by Arild Andersen except as indicated
 "Shimri" - 5:55   
 "No Tears" - 9:27   
 "Ways of Days" - 4:47   
 "Wood Song" (Arild Andersen, Juhani Aaltonen, Lars Jansson, Pål Thowsen) -  6:02   
 "Vaggvisa för Hanna" (Jansson) - 3:46   
 "Dedication" - 11:43  
Recorded at Talent Studios in Oslo, Norway in October 1976

Personnel
Arild Andersen - bass
Juhani Aaltonen - tenor saxophone, soprano saxophone, flute, percussion
Lars Jansson - piano 
Pål Thowsen - drums

References

ECM Records albums
Arild Andersen albums
1977 albums
Albums produced by Manfred Eicher